Laurent Esso (born August 10, 1942) is a Cameroonian politician who is currently serving in Joseph Ngute's government.

Esso held a succession of key posts under President Paul Biya since 1988. He served in the government of Cameroon as Minister of Justice from 1996 to 2000, Minister of Public Health from 2000 to 2001, Minister of Defense from 2001 to 2004, and Minister of Foreign Affairs from 2004 to 2006. Subsequently, Esso was Secretary-General of the Presidency, with the rank of Minister of State, from September 2006 to December 2011. He has again served as Minister of Justice since December 2011.

Biography
An ethnic Sawa, Esso was born at Douala. He was a magistrate and subsequently worked as Chancellor of the University of Yaoundé.

Esso left his post at the University of Yaoundé when President Paul Biya appointed him as Deputy Secretary-General of the Presidency on May 16, 1988. Considered a "reform-minded technocrat", Esso spent less than a year as Deputy Secretary-General of the Presidency before Biya instead appointed him as Director of the Civil Cabinet of the Presidency on April 13, 1989. Esso remained Director of the Civil Cabinet for seven years; he was then appointed Minister of Justice in the government named on September 19, 1996. On March 18, 2000, he was moved from his position as Justice Minister to that of Minister of Public Health; after one year in the latter position, he was appointed Minister-Delegate at the Presidency in charge of Defense on April 27, 2001. In the government named on December 8, 2004, he was instead appointed Minister of Foreign Affairs, in which position he remained until he was appointed Minister of State and Secretary-General of the Presidency on September 22, 2006.

Noted for his quiet discretion and firm loyalty to Paul Biya, Esso is considered to be one of Biya's most trusted and powerful associates. According to one analysis, Esso had "a reputation for technocratic competence and integrity" that distinguished him in the Biya regime. He is a member of the ruling Cameroon People's Democratic Movement and was a member of the National Commission for the coordination of Biya's election campaign in the October 2004 presidential election.

After holding the key post of Secretary-General of the Presidency for five years, Esso was instead appointed to his former post as Minister of Justice on 9 December 2011.

On February 14, 2023, the government commissioner of the military tribunal requested an additional investigation from the State Secretariat for Defense (SED), in the case of Martinez Zogo, a journalist kidnapped on January 17, 2023 and whose lifeless body was found five days later, on the outskirts of Yaoundé. The military court requested the hearing of Laurent Esso in this case.

References

1942 births
Living people
Cameroon People's Democratic Movement politicians
Government ministers of Cameroon
Defence ministers of Cameroon